Legislative elections were held in United States Virgin Islands on 4 November 2008.

United States House of Representatives 

Incumbent U.S. Virgin Islands Delegate Donna Christian-Christensen announced that she intended to seek a fourth term in the United States House of Representatives.  Her announcement of her decision to seek re-election came in a press conference held at her congressional district office in Sunny Isle, United States Virgin Islands, on January 10, 2008. Christensen ran unopposed in the 2008 Congressional election.

References